Pughsville may refer to:

Pughsville, Virginia
Pughsville, Florida, an African American neighborhood that developed adjacent to Winter Haven